is a Japanese sprinter. He competed in the men's 4 × 400 metres relay at the 2016 Summer Olympics.

Personal bests

National Record Holder

International competition

References

External links

Tomoya_Tamura at Sumitomo Electric Athletics Club 

1992 births
Living people
Sportspeople from Aichi Prefecture
Japanese male sprinters
Olympic athletes of Japan
Athletes (track and field) at the 2016 Summer Olympics
World Athletics Championships athletes for Japan
Place of birth missing (living people)
21st-century Japanese people